Maesteg Rugby Football Club is a rugby union team from the town of Maesteg, South Wales. The club currently play in the Division 3B west Central Welsh Rugby Union and is a feeder club for the Ospreys.

Club history
Maesteg RFC was formed in 1877 in the Llynfi Valley, in the county of Glamorgan. They were county league champions 1912 to 1913. The 1949 team completed their season without losing a single game. In 1978 and 1979 they were the Whitbread league champions. In 1982 they played the Irish Wolfhounds, Crawshays RFC, Toronto Welsh RFC, German Federation and the New Zealand Māoris; they held the latter to a 10-10 draw. These games were thought at the time to be part of the centenary season of the club. It was later discovered that this was untrue, as the centenary was five years earlier.

Maesteg were promoted to the Welsh Premier Division in 2005, but were relegated back to division one when they came bottom of the league in the 2007/08 season.

Notable former players
See also :Category:Maesteg RFC players
The below players have represented Maesteg and have been capped at international level.

  Billy Banks Wales and Great Britain rugby league international
  Allan Bateman Wales international & British Lion
  Gwyn Evans Wales international and British Lion
  Chico Hopkins Wales international and British Lion
  Fred Hutchinson
  Trevor Lloyd Wales international and British Lion
  Glyn Moses Wales and Great Britain rugby league international
  Charlie Pugh
  Ike Owens Wales & Great Britain rugby league international
  Alan Rees Wales international
  Aaron Rees Wales international
  David Watts

Club honours
 Glamorgan Challenge Cup 1912 - Champions
 Whitbread Merit Table 1977/78 - Champions
 Whitbread Merit Table 1978/79 - Champions
 SWALEC Plate 2009/10 - Champions
 WRU Division Two West 2009.10 - Champions

References

Rugby clubs established in 1877
Welsh rugby union teams
Sport in Bridgend County Borough
Maesteg
1877 establishments in Wales